Damantang Camara was a Guinean politician. He served in the first council of the Politburo of the First Republic of Guinea as Minister of Public Affairs from 1957. At one point he was President of the National Assembly.

References

Guinean schoolteachers
Government ministers of Guinea
1985 deaths
Year of birth missing
Presidents of the National Assembly (Guinea)
Members of the National Assembly (Guinea)